Boyce Park is a  county park lying mostly in the Borough of Plum, in eastern Allegheny County, Pennsylvania, United States. It is a part of the county's  network of nine distinct parks. Its southernmost reaches (south of Old Frankstown Road) also extend into neighboring Monroeville.

Established in 1963, it is named for William D. Boyce, the founder of the Boy Scouts of America, who was born in the area. It is the only park in the county for downhill skiing, with ski lifts and a lodge. It also offers a wave pool, tennis courts, ball fields, a nature center, greenhouse, arboretum and trails. The source of Plum Creek is in the northwest section of the park.

Sources

References

External links
 

Parks in the Pittsburgh metropolitan area
Parks in Allegheny County, Pennsylvania
Ski areas and resorts in Pennsylvania
Nature centers in Pennsylvania
1963 establishments in Pennsylvania
County parks in the United States